Oleksandr Hryhorovych Povoroznyuk (born 6 March 1971) is a Ukrainian farmer. General Director of Ahrofirma Pyatykhatska LLC, President of football club Inhulets Petrove.

Biography 
Oleksandr Povorozniuk was born on 6 March 1971 in the village of Novomanuylivka, Kirovohrad Oblast. He become the chairman of Pyatihatska Agricultural Company operates on 12,000 hectares of land and makes a profit of ₴12-15 million a year. He mentioned that he can spend 6-8 million a year on a team. He also become the chairman of the charity fund "With people and for people". Since 2017 he also become the Coach of Epicenter of the Kirovohrad Oblast and Member of the Village Revival Party.

Sports and patronage

In spring 2009 he become President of Desna Chernihiv football club of the city of Chernihiv, until 2010 and business partner with the businessman Valeriy Korotkov. Oleksandr Povorozniuk was ready to invest his own funds in the football club: However, the local authorities, despite promises to support the club and complete the Chernihiv Stadium, did nothing. In the summer of 2010, Povoroznyuk abandoned Desna Chernihiv due to the club's debts.

In 2013 he created Inhulets Petrove a football club from the town of Petrove in Kirovohrad Oblast. He managed to bring the club to win the Ukrainian Amateur Cup in 2014 and competed in the 2015 Amateur Championship and successfully bring the club to join the PFL and entering into the Ukrainian Second League. Inhulets Petrove continued its participation among amateurs with its second team, FC Inhulets-2 Petrove. In their first season, the club were promoted to the Ukrainian First League. His club competed also at the 2015 UEFA Regions' Cup as "AF Pyatykhatska" representing Ukraine. In 2019, the club reached one of its greatest achievements, arriving at the final of Ukrainian Cup in the season 2018–19. The game ended with a 4-0 defeat by Shakhtar Donetsk. At the end of the 2019-20 season, Inhulets was promoted to the Ukrainian Premier League for the first time in their history. Povorozniuk signed good players to reinforce the team like Nika Sichinava, Illya Shevtsov and Pavlo Polehenko.

See also
 FC Desna Chernihiv
 FC Inhulets Petrove

References

External links
 Official Site FC Inhulets Petrove

1971 births
Living people
People from Kirovohrad Oblast
FC Desna Chernihiv presidents
FC Inhulets Petrove presidents
Ukrainian farmers
Ukrainian football chairmen and investors
20th-century Ukrainian businesspeople
21st-century Ukrainian businesspeople